The Michael Showalter Showalter was an internet video series starring by Michael Showalter that was hosted on the website, CollegeHumor.

The show lasted for one season of ten episodes that all aired from 2007 to 2008. The series was a chat show hosted by Showalter. Each episode features a guest, usually a comedian or an actor. Showalter typically gives intentionally awkward and humorous interviews, in which he is occasionally seen asking to borrow money from his interviewee.

Episodes

References

External links
 

American comedy web series